Bradley Esmond Scott (born 16 September 1979 in Ashburton, Canterbury) is a member of the Northern Districts cricket team having previously played for Otago. He is a left arm fast medium bowler and useful lower order batsman.

Scott made his first-class debut for Otago in the 2000/01 season, he played for the club until the 2007/08 season, making 43 appearances and taking 10 wickets at 25. Scott joined the Northern Districts for the 2008–09 season.

Scott was selected as part of the 30 man preliminary squad for the Champions Trophy in 2006 alongside fellow Otago team-mate Nathan McCullum and was also selected for the World Twenty20 which was held in September 2007.

As well as being a cricketer for Northern Districts, he also plays Football for Melville United, and Teaches at King's High School.

See also
 List of Otago representative cricketers

External links
 
 

1979 births
Living people
New Zealand cricketers
Otago cricketers
Northern Districts cricketers
Sportspeople from Ashburton, New Zealand